Wild Man of Borneo or Wild Man from Borneo may refer to:

People
 Dayak people, indigenous people of Borneo
 Oofty Goofty or Wild Man of Borneo, real name Leon Borchardt (1862–1923 or later), German-born sideshow performer in the United States
 Wild Men of Borneo, Waino and Plutanor, real names Hiram W. Davis (1825–1905) and Barney Davis (1827–1912), American dwarf brothers and freak show performers
 Nickname for Jimi Hendrix (1942–70), American rock musician
Animals
 Wild Man From Borneo, racehorse that won the 1895 Grand National 
 Bornean orangutan, primate species
Fiction
 The Wild Man of Borneo (film),  1941 American comedy film
 "Wild Man from Borneo", fictional freakshow in The Kid from Borneo, a 1933 short comedy film
 “Wild Man from Borneo”, a song by country singer Kinky Friedman

See also
 Wild man (disambiguation)
 Wild Women of Borneo, 1932 goona-goona epic film